Yeosucheon is a river of South Korea. It is a tributary of the Han River.

References

Rivers of South Korea